Selenidium is a genus of parasitic alveolates in the phylum Apicomplexa. Species in this genus infect marine invertebrates.

Taxonomy
This genus was created by Giard in 1884. Fifty six species have been described in this genus.

The type species is Selenidium pendula Giard, 1884.

Description
All species in this genus infect marine invertebrates.

Life cycle
These species infect the gut of polychaete worms.

The trophozoites are vermiform with an apical complex. They have few epicytic folds. A dense array of microtubules lies under a trilayered pellicle.

Syzygy occurs in the tail-to-tail, head-to-head and lateral positions.

The gamonts are extracellular. They are foliaceous or cylindroid in shape and have longitudinal striations.

The oocysts are spherical or ovoid, are 12-18 microns in diameter and their wall is 1 micron thick. They have four infective sporozoites each.

The sporozoites undergo schizogony (merogony).

References

Apicomplexa genera